Parli Vaijnath railway station is a railway station in Beed district, Maharashtra. Its code is PRLI. It serves Parli Vaijnath city. The station consists of three platforms. The platforms are well sheltered. There is an elevator on platform no 1.

Parli Vaijnath is well connected to Hyderabad, Nizamabad, Osmanabad, Manmad, Kakinada, Vijayawada, Rajahmundry, Khammam, Warangal, Aurangabad, Latur, Parbhani, Purna, Nanded, Vikarabad, Zaheerabad, Bidar, Latur road , Raichur, Guntakal, Mumbai, Nashik road, Bengaluru, Nagpur and Dhanbad.

Trains

Originates 

 Parli Vaijnath–Adilabad Passenger (unreserved)
 Parli Vaijnath–Miraj Express 
 Parli Vaijnath–Akola Passenger (unreserved)
 Parli Vaijnath–Purna Passenger (unreserved)

Passing through 

The following trains pass through from Parli Vaijnath railway station:

 Panvel–Hazur Sahib Nanded Express (via Latur)
 Aurangabad–Tirupati  Weekly Express
 Aurangabad–Hyderabad Passenger
 Chhatrapati Shahu Maharaj Terminus Kolhapur–Nagpur Express (via Latur, Hingoli)
 Hazur Sahib Nanded – KSR Bengaluru City Express
 Hyderabad–Purna Passenger
 Nizamabad–Pandharpur Passenger 
 Sainagar Shirdi–Secunderabad Express
 Sainagar Shirdi–Vijayawada Express
 Sainagar Shirdi–Kakinada Port Express
Deekshabhoomi Express

References

Railway stations in Beed district
Secunderabad railway division